Papuanthes is a monotypic genus of flowering plants belonging to the family Loranthaceae. The only species is Papuanthes albertisii.

Its native range is New Guinea.

References

Loranthaceae
Loranthaceae genera
Monotypic Santalales genera